Chikosi Basden (born 1 February 1995), sometimes known as Kosi Basden, is a Bermudian professional footballer who plays as a right-back for Redbridge and the Bermuda national football team

Club career
Basden moved to England from Bermuda at the age of 15, an began playing football in the academy of Stoke City. He had brief spells in the lower divisions of England with Enfield Town and Chesterfield. After playing for Hertford Town and Cockfosters, Basden signed for Hatfield Town in November 2018. He played for London Colney during the 2019–20 season.

International career
Basden made his senior debut with the Bermuda national football team in a 2–2 friendly tie with Cuba on 22 February 2019.

References

External links
 
 
 Chikosi Basden - Aylesbury United F.C.

1995 births
Living people
Bermudian footballers
Bermuda international footballers
Chesterfield F.C. players
Hertford Town F.C. players
Hatfield Town F.C. players
Cockfosters F.C. players
London Colney F.C. players
Association football forwards